WVJP-FM (103.3 FM), branded on-air as Dimension 103, is a radio station broadcasting a Spanish Variety format. The music genres included in the station's programming are "merengue", "salsa", "bachata", "reggaeton", English-pop, pop-rock and "balada-pop".

WVJP is the primary station of Dimension 103, a network that includes WVJP AM 1110 and WDIN/102.9 FM, covering the western and northern area of Puerto Rico.

Licensed to Caguas, Puerto Rico, United States, it serves the Puerto Rico area. The station is currently owned by Borinquen Broadcasting Co., Inc.

External links

VJP-FM
Radio stations established in 1964
1964 establishments in Puerto Rico
Caguas, Puerto Rico